Leopold Facco (10 November 1907 – 9 October 1993) was an Austrian footballer. He played in two matches for the Austria national football team from 1930 to 1931.

References

External links
 

1907 births
1993 deaths
Austrian footballers
Austria international footballers
Place of birth missing
Association footballers not categorized by position